Bjurholm is a locality and seat of Bjurholm Municipality in Västerbotten County, Sweden with 968 inhabitants in 2010. It is the second smallest municipal seat in Sweden (Österbymo is smaller) and the seat of the least populated municipality in the country. A tourist attraction in the region is Älgens Hus (The Elk house). Here visitors can see a tame moose and find out more about elks.

There had been an earlier simple wooden church here that was built at the start of the nineteenth century. The current church is higher than the main town and it dates from 1932 when the second church that had been built in 1875 burnt down.  The current church includes a chandelier from the older church and its more recent bells included some alloy from the bells lost to the fire.

References 

Municipal seats of Västerbotten County
Swedish municipal seats
Populated places in Västerbotten County
Populated places in Bjurholm Municipality